Athanasius Rethna Swamy Swamiadian is the current serving bishop of the Roman Catholic Diocese of Ahmedabad, India.

Early life and education 
Swamy was born on 10 February 1961 at Tamil Nadu, India. He studied from St. Charles Major Seminary in Nagpur. He has also acquired a Licentiate in Clinical Psychology from the Pontifical Gregorian University.

Priesthood 
On 29 March 1989, Swamy was ordained a priest by Bishop Charles Gomes, S.J.

Episcopate 
Swamy was appointed bishop of Ahmedabad on 29 January 2018 by Pope Francis and consecrated by Thomas Ignatius MacWan on 14 April 2018. Prior to his appointment he was serving as the Rector of Vianney Vihar, Major Seminary in Vadodara.

References 

1961 births
Living people
Bishops appointed by Pope Francis
Indian bishops
Pontifical Gregorian University alumni
21st-century Roman Catholic bishops in India
Indian expatriates in Italy
People from Tamil Nadu